Dagnoceras is a ceratitid ammonite from the Lower Triassic that has a basically evolutute, discoidal shell with an arched venter and ceratitic sutures. The Treatise 1957 includes it in the Meekoceratidae although it has since been placed in the Dinaritidae.

References
Notes

Bibliography
 Arkell, et al., 1957. Treatise on Invertebrate Paleontology Part L, Mesozoic Ammonoidea. Geological Society of America.

Triassic ammonites
Ammonites of Europe
Olenekian life